Shuzo Matsuoka was the defending champion, but lost in the quarterfinals this year.

Chuck Adams won the title, defeating Todd Woodbridge 6–4, 6–4 in the final.

Seeds

Draw

Finals

Top half

Bottom half

References

External links
 Main draw
 ITF tournament edition details

Seoul Open
1993 ATP Tour
1993 Seoul Open